Pycnodytis is a genus of moths in the family Gelechiidae.

Species
Pycnodytis erebaula Meyrick, 1918 (from South Africa)
Pycnodytis irrigata Meyrick, 1918 (from Madagascar)

References

De Prins, J. & De Prins, W. 2015. Afromoths, online database of Afrotropical moth species (Lepidoptera). World Wide Web electronic publication (www.afromoths.net) (21-Mar-2015)

Anomologinae
Taxa named by Edward Meyrick
Moth genera